Carstairs is a surname. Notable people with the surname include:

 Henrietta Carstairs (1777/78 – after 1817), British mountaineer and nanny
 Carroll Carstairs (1888–1948), American art dealer
 George Carstairs (rugby league) (1900–1966), Australian rugby league player
 Joe Carstairs (1900–1993), British power boat racer
 John Paddy Carstairs (1910–1970), British film and television director
 Steven Carstairs (1910–1998), Scottish radiologist
 Morris Carstairs (1916–1991), British psychiatrist and anthropologist
 Alan Carstairs (born 1939), Australian politician
 Sharon Carstairs (born 1942), Canadian politician
 Jim Carstairs (born 1971), Scottish footballer

Fictional characters:
 Lt. Fairfax and Lt. Carstairs, from the BBC sitcom 'Allo 'Allo!
 James "Jem" Carstairs, from The Infernal Devices series by Cassandra Clare

See also
William Carstares (1649–1715), minister of the Church of Scotland